Pertaining to web services, Secure-Adaptive Architecture (SAA) refers to a particular approach towards the security management issues inherent in data transfer over computer networks, relating to certain services, such as micropayments.

Minimalist approach
In SAA, personal information (such as an end-user's name, banking information, or personal identity numbers such as Social Security numbers) is not retained.  This has two main benefits:  For the end-user, the chance of identity theft and fraud is considerably reduced.  For the service provider, it means that direct communication with the end-user's financial institution is unnecessary.

Security techniques
SAA uses "best in class" proven security techniques to ensure the safe transfer of data through network resources.  These include protocols such as SSL communications, client-side authentication and AES encryption.

Monitoring
SAA requires consistent and pervasive, real-time monitoring of network resources to ensure security.

See also
Adaptive architecture

Web services